Men of the Fighting Lady  is a 1954 American war drama film directed by Andrew Marton and starring Van Johnson, Walter Pidgeon, Louis Calhern and Keenan Wynn. The screenplay was written by U.S. Navy Commander Harry A. Burns, who had written a Saturday Evening Post article, "The Case of the Blinded Pilot", an account of a U.S. Navy pilot in the Korean War, who saves a blinded Navy pilot by talking him down to a successful landing. Men of the Fighting Lady was also inspired by another Saturday Evening Post article, "The Forgotten Heroes of Korea" by James A. Michener. The original music score was composed by Miklós Rózsa. It is also known as Panther Squadron.

Plot
On board the aircraft carrier  in the Sea of Japan during the Korean War, author James A. Michener (Louis Calhern) meets Commander and flight surgeon Kent Dowling (Walter Pidgeon). Dowling relates a "Christmas story" of a near-miracle.

Ensign Kenneth Schecter (Dewey Martin) is one of VF 192 squadron pilots flying Grumman F9F Panther fighter-bombers who are forced to go back to destroy an enemy railroad that is rebuilt after each attack. Their leader, Lieutenant Commander Paul Grayson (Frank Lovejoy), is even shot down during one mission and rescued from the sea. Veteran pilot Lieutenant Commander Ted Dodson (Keenan Wynn) criticizes Grayson for flying too low and risking his life. Ironically, it is Dodson who loses his life in another mission when his damaged aircraft explodes on landing.

For their 27th mission against the enemy target, the squadron flies out on Christmas Day, and Schecter is hit by enemy fire and blinded. Lieutenant Thayer (Van Johnson) guides Schecter by radio to a safe landing on the deck of the carrier. The squadron celebrates his safe return, but also mourns the loss of good men like Dodson.

Cast
 Van Johnson as Lieutenant (jg) Howard Thayer
 Walter Pidgeon as Commander Kent Dowling
 Louis Calhern as James A. Michener
 Dewey Martin as Ensign Kenneth Schechter
 Keenan Wynn as Lieutenant Commander Ted Dodson
 Frank Lovejoy as Lieutenant Commander Paul Grayson
 Robert Horton as Ensign Neil Conovan
 Bert Freed as Lieutenant (jg) Andrew Szymanski
 Lewis Martin as Commander Michael Coughlin
 George Cooper as Cyril Roberts
 Dick Simmons as Lieutenant Wayne Kimbrell
 Ann Baker as Mary, Schechter's fiancée

Production

Men of the Fighting Lady was filmed aboard the aircraft carrier USS Oriskany with principal photography taking place from October 16 to November 10, 1953 at, and near San Diego, California. Stock footage of Korean War combat was also integrated into the live action sequences. The scene where Keenan Wynn's character is killed in a fiery crash landing on the carrier is actual footage of a F9F Panther accident during one of its early test flights. The air pocket dropped most of the plane below the landing deck level, but he managed to keep the nose up above the deck at the time of impact, severing both wings and aft fuselage, and expelling the plane's cockpit and nose onto the carrier deck as a fireball erupted behind him. Except for burning his ears, Duncan survived the crash unharmed.

The climactic "Christmas Story" rescue was based on a real life event that occurred during the Korean War. Thayer guided his friend to a safe landing at K-18, a U.S. Marine airfield.

Reception
Due to its release shortly after the end of the Korean War, the Men of the Fighting Lady was well received by the general public as well as by critics as a mainly factual account of aerial combat. Bosley Crowther of The New York Times gave the film a very favorable review: "Men of the Fighting Lady, which came yesterday to the Globe, bearing a title that echoes a dandy factual film of World War II, turns out to be an apt successor to that saga of the aircraft carriers, translating now a stirring story of carrier planes and men in the Korean war."

According to MGM records, Men of the Fighting Lady made $1,502,000 in the U.S. and Canada and $1,136,000 in other countries, resulting in a profit of $729,000.

See also
The Bridges at Toko-Ri, released the same year
List of Korean War films, for a comprehensive list of feature films and documentaries

References

Notes

Bibliography

 Evans, Alun. Brassey's Guide to War Films. Dulles, Virginia: Potomac Books, 2000. .

External links
 
 
 
 The Case of the Blind Pilot by Cmdr Harry A. Burns

1954 films
1950s English-language films
Films set in the 1950s
Korean War aviation films
Films scored by Miklós Rózsa
Metro-Goldwyn-Mayer films
Films based on works by James A. Michener
The Saturday Evening Post
Films directed by Andrew Marton
American war drama films
1950s war drama films
1950s American films